Dorotheergasse is a narrow lane, terminating at the Graben to the north and Augustinerstraße to the south, part of the Old Town district of Vienna, Austria. It is named for the monastery of St. Dorothea, Dorotheerkloster.

Dorotheergasse is home to Dorotheum, one of the world's oldest auction houses. The Jewish Museum Vienna is also located in Dorotheergasse.

References

External links 
 
 St. Dorothea and the Augustinian Canons

Innere Stadt
Streets in Vienna
Shopping districts and streets in Austria
Pedestrian streets in Austria